Renaud, ou La suite d'Armide (Renaud, or the Sequel to "Armide") is an opera by the French composer Henri Desmarets, first performed at the Académie Royale de Musique (the Paris Opera) on 5 March 1722. It takes the form of a tragédie en musique in a prologue and five acts. The libretto, by Simon-Joseph Pellegrin, is based on Torquato Tasso's Gerusalemme liberata. The opera is a sequel to Jean-Baptiste Lully's Armide (1686). 

The libretto had an influence on Antonio Sacchini's opera Renaud, first performed in 1783.

Sources
 Libretto at "Livrets baroques"
 Félix Clément and Pierre Larousse Dictionnaire des Opéras, Paris, 1881,  page 570.

French-language operas
Tragédies en musique
Operas by Henri Desmarets
Operas based on works by Torquato Tasso
Operas
1722 operas